KSA is the Kingdom of Saudi Arabia, an Arab sovereign state in western Asia.

KSA or Ksa may also refer to:

Places
 Kosrae International Airport (IATA airport code), Federated States of Micronesia
 Kingsford-Smith Airport or Sydney Airport, Australia

Organisations
 Kenya Scouts Association
 Kommando Strategische Aufklärung (Strategic Reconnaissance Command), a German intelligence organization
 Korea Science Academy or Korea Science Academy of KAIST
 Korea Scout Association
 Korean Standards Association
 Kosher Supervision of America
 KSA-TV, a defunct cable television station in Sitka, Alaska, United States

Other uses
 Ksa (spirit), a Native American Lakota and Oglala spirit of wisdom
 Key-scheduling algorithm, an algorithm in RC4 cryptography
 King's South Africa Medal, a medal for service in the Boer War
 Knowledge, Skills, and Abilities, statements historically required when applying for U.S. federal government jobs
 Kogge–Stone adder, a type of digital adder
 KSA, a kölsch-style ale by Fort Point Beer Company
 Ohio State University Knowlton School of Architecture, housed in Knowlton Hall
 Kirby Star Allies, a 2018 video game